GeneSat-1 is a NASA fully automated, CubeSat spaceflight system that provides life support for bacteria E. Coli K-12. The system was launched into orbit on 16 December 2006, from Wallops Flight Facility. GeneSat-1 began to transmit data on its first pass over the mission's California ground station.

The nanosatellite contains onboard micro-laboratory systems such as sensors and optical systems that can detect proteins that are the products of specific genetic activity. Knowledge gained from GeneSat-1 is intended to aid scientific understanding of how spaceflight affects the human body.

Weighing 4.6 kilograms, the miniature laboratory was a secondary payload on an Air Force four-stage Minotaur 1 launch vehicle that delivered the Air Force TacSat-2 satellite to orbit. In the development of the GeneSat satellite class (at a fraction of what it normally costs to conduct a mission in space), Ames Research Center (Small Spacecraft Office) collaborated with organisations in industry and also universities local to the center. It is NASA's first fully automated, self-contained biological spaceflight experiment on a satellite of its size.

References

External links 
 A list from the NASA database retrieved 08:55(UTC) 24 October 2011
 GeneSat-1 mission dashboard Santa Clara University Robotics Systems Laboratory  retrieved 08:19 24.10.2011

Biosatellites
Spacecraft launched in 2006
CubeSats
Spacecraft which reentered in 2010
NASA satellites